Mionochroma carmen is a species of beetle in the family Cerambycidae. It was described by Napp and Martins in 2009. It is known from Colombia.

References

Cerambycinae
Beetles described in 2009